Forrest Cary Eggleston (September 28, 1920 to Nov 7, 2016) was an American surgeon who trained 101 residents at  Christian Medical College Ludhiana in India.

Biography
Eggleston is an alumnus of Princeton University, and passed his MD in 1945 from Cornell University Medical College. He then trained first in general surgery and then in cardio-thoracic surgery. He worked in different hospitals in New York till December 1953 and then moved to India.

He moved to India to work as a missionary training doctors in the field of surgery.

He first worked in a small town in Himachal for a few years. 
Then he moved to Christian Medical College, Ludhiana as the head of surgery department and spent the rest of his 33 years in India over there.
Ludhiana was a small town in those days. He developed the department of general surgery and cardio-thoracic surgery and trained 101 surgeons.

Eggleston received the Woodrow Wilson award from Princeton University in 2000 

His work and experiences are summarised in his book Christian Medical College, Ludhiana: A 33 Year Experience 1953-1986 : a Personal Perspective 

Eggleston was the founder president of the Northern Chapter of Association of surgeons of India. 
Christian Medical College, Ludhiana, India,   has dedicated a library to his name:

He was the director of Christian Medical College and Hospital from 1982 to 1986. He retired after holding this highest office in the medical college and went back home to USA. http://cmcludhiana.in/cmc_2014/directors-office/

Dr Eggleston died pm Nov 7, 2016 in a retirement home in Mechanicsbergh.

References

External links
 http://ecommons.library.cornell.edu/bitstream/1813/18769/1/Eggleston_Cary_1966.pdf
 http://www.ctsnet.org/home/rceggleston

Princeton University alumni
Weill Cornell Medical College alumni